What's It All About is a solo album by jazz guitarist Pat Metheny, released by Nonesuch Records on June 14, 2011. It is Metheny's first album which does not include his own material. On February 12, 2012, What's It All About received a Grammy Award for Best New Age Album.

Track listing

Personnel
 Pat Metheny – baritone guitar, 42-string guitar (track 1), 6-string guitar (track 4), nylon-string guitar (track 10)

Charts

Awards
Grammy Awards

References 

Pat Metheny albums
2011 albums
Nonesuch Records albums
Instrumental albums